Coriolis is a lunar impact crater that is located on the far side of the Moon. The crater floor is bisected by the lunar equator, and it lies about three crater diameters northwest of the crater Daedalus.

The rim of this formation is somewhat eroded, and several small craters lie along the edge. The northern rim is somewhat damaged, and has a slight outward bulge and depression in the side. The interior floor has small craters along the eastern and southern inner walls. There are also some low hills near the mid-part of the floor.

Satellite craters
By convention these features are identified on lunar maps by placing the letter on the side of the crater midpoint that is closest to Coriolis.

Satellite craters photographed by Apollo 11:

References

 
 
 
 
 
 
 
 
 
 
 
 

Impact craters on the Moon